Persatuan Sepakbola Bondowoso  was an Indonesian football club based in Bondowoso, East Java. The club last competes in Indonesia Soccer Championship B. Persebo move their homebase to Sumenep, Madura and became Madura FC.

Stadium 
Since there is no qualified stadium in Bondowoso for the Liga Indonesia Premier Division, they used Semeru Stadium in Lumajang for the 2014 Liga Indonesia Premier Division.

References

External links 
 Persebo Bondowoso at Liga Indonesia 

Football clubs in Indonesia
Defunct football clubs in Indonesia
Association football clubs established in 1970
Association football clubs disestablished in 2017